Defending champions John Bromwich and Adrian Quist defeated Colin Long and Don Turnbull 6–4, 7–5, 6–2, to win the men's doubles tennis title at the 1939 Australian Championships.

Seeds

  John Bromwich /  Adrian Quist (champions)
  Harry Hopman /  Len Schwartz (semifinals)
  Jack Crawford /  Vivian McGrath (semifinals)
  Jack Clemenger /  Jack Harper (quarterfinals)

Draw

References

External links
  Source for seedings
  Source for the draw

1939 in Australian tennis
Men's Doubles